Acontia transfigurata is a moth of the family Noctuidae. It is found in most countries of subtropical Africa south of the Sahara.

Subspecies
 Acontia transfigurata transfigurata Wallengren, 1856
 Acontia transfigurata stumpffi  Saalmüller, 1891 (Madagascar)

References

External links
 africanmoths: pictures of Acontia transfigurata
 Swedish Museum of Natural History - picture of typus

transfigurata
Moths described in 1856
Moths of Africa
Moths of Madagascar
Moths of Seychelles
Moths of the Middle East